Putham Pudhu Payanam is a 1991 Indian Tamil-language film directed by K. S. Ravikumar and produced by R. B. Choudary. The film stars Anand Babu, Vivek, Chinni Jayanth, Supergood Kannan and Ravikumar. It was released on 22 November 1991.

Plot 

Vivek, Narayanan and Kannan are admitted to a hospital for treatment. Babu, son of a rich businessman, is also admitted in the same ward as them. They become friends in a short time period. They finally come to know that they will live only for few more months: the four friends have blood cancer. They decide to leave the hospital and to travel.

The friends arrive in a small village where Sivalingam spreads terror among the villagers. The friends are accommodated by an old blind woman and her daughter Nirmala. Thereafter, Sivalingam's son Kumar and the poor village girl Nirmala fall in love with each other. After a lot of struggles throughout the events of the film, the four friends succeed in killing Sivalingam and uniting Kumar and Nirmala, sacrificing their lives in the process. The film ends with Kumar and Nirmala laying flowers at the graves of the four friends and Kumar taking Babu's bracelet as a token of their memory.

Cast 

Anand Babu as Babu
Vivek as Vivek
Chinni Jayanth as Narayanan
Supergood Kannan as Kannan
K. S. Ravikumar as Sivalingam
Chithra
Sukumari
Sulakshana as Raani, Sivalingam's wife
V. Gopalakrishnan as Babu's father
M. R. Krishnamurthy as Narayanan's father
Loose Mohan as Loose
Kumarimuthu as 'All in All' Arumugam
Mohankumar as Kumar
Nirmala Shyam as Nirmala
Erode Sounder as Varathan
Vijayachandrika as  Narayanan's mother
Indiradevi
Anuja as Varathan's wife
Thideer Kannaiah as Hospital Patient
Kango as Kalaiyan
Nagesh as a doctor (guest appearance)

Soundtrack 
The music was composed by Soundaryan, who also wrote the lyrics.

Release and reception 
Putham Pudhu Payanam was released on 22 November 1991. N. Krishnaswamy of The Indian Express positively reviewed the film, saying it proved that "commercially viable films can be made with a small cast without stars".

References

External links 
 

1990s Tamil-language films
1991 films
Films directed by K. S. Ravikumar
Super Good Films films